The National Committee of Reconciliation and Development (CNRD) is the ruling military junta of Guinea since 5 September 2021.

Historical background
The CNRD seized power in the 2021 Guinean coup d'état on 5 September 2021. Colonel Mamady Doumbouya, leader of the coup, stated that the CNRD  would steer the country for an 18-month transition period.

See also
Politics of Guinea

References

2021 establishments in Guinea
Politics of Guinea
Political organisations based in Guinea
Military dictatorships